John Pugh (June 2, 1761 – July 13, 1842) was a member of the U.S. House of Representatives from Pennsylvania.

Pugh was born in Hilltown Township, Pennsylvania. He briefly served in the American Revolutionary War as a captain in the Pennsylvania militia. He engaged in agricultural and mercantile pursuits, and served as justice of the peace. He was a member of the Pennsylvania House of Representatives from 1800 to 1804.

Pugh was elected as a Democratic-Republican to the Ninth and Tenth Congresses.  He was an unsuccessful candidate for reelection in 1808 to the Eleventh Congress.  He was register of wills and recorder of deeds of Bucks County, Pennsylvania, from 1810 to 1821.  He died in Doylestown, Pennsylvania and was buried in the Presbyterian Churchyard.

References

The Political Graveyard

1761 births
1842 deaths
American Presbyterians
Members of the Pennsylvania House of Representatives
Pennsylvania militiamen in the American Revolution
Democratic-Republican Party members of the United States House of Representatives from Pennsylvania